Aimée Duffy is a Welsh-language extended play (EP) by Welsh singer Aimée Duffy (now Duffy), released in 2004 on Welsh record label Awen Records. Originally to be entitled Rock, Roll & Soul, the release came after the singer had come second in a Welsh televised talent show.

Background and release of EP
After finishing her GCSEs in Pembrokeshire, Duffy returned to Nefyn when she was fifteen, and started singing in various local bands. Following an unsuccessful music project in Switzerland, Duffy returned to Wales in 2003 and was invited to appear on Wawffactor, a Welsh television show similar to Pop Idol, on local station S4C. She was expected to win, but came second to winner Lisa Pedrig.

In 2004, Duffy recorded this three-song EP, which was written and produced by Paul Eastham of international Celtic rock band COAST then released by Awen Records in the same year. The release of this EP and her appearance on WawFfactor had garnered herself a popular name among the Welsh-speaking community of Wales. The EP's title is the full name of Duffy, and was also released under the name Aimée Duffy. It was after the EP's release that she decided to use the stagename Duffy professionally.

Track listing
All songs written by Aimée Duffy and produced by Bev Jones, with music by Winter of Clowns.

Personnel
Adapted from Awen Records and Aimée Duffy.
Music and lyrics
Aimée Ann Duffy – lyrics, lead vocals
Paul Eastham"coast – music
Bev Jones – production
Tim Woodward – mastering
Instrumentation
Paul Eastham – piano, synths, guitar
Mark Beal – drums
Greg Latham – bass
Charlie Goodall – solo guitar ("Hedfan Angel")
Graham Land – cymbals ("Cariad Dwi'n Unig")
Graphics and design
Ed Pari Jones – images
Kit Wong – graphic design
Mark Walker – graphic design assistant
Lois Griffin – art

References

External links
Official website

2004 debut EPs
Duffy (singer) EPs
Welsh-language albums